Corrado (also known as Bad Ass) is 2010 film starring Tom Sizemore, Johnny Messner, Candace Elaine, and Edoardo Ballerini.

Plot
Corrado is the story of a Los Angeles hit man of the same name. Corrado (Messner) is given the task of eliminating the aging kingpin Vittorio Spinello. He readily accepts the job and is about to perform the hit when he is interrupted by Spinello's new nurse, Julia (Elaine). He shoots the aging Spinello by accident, instead of suffocating him as intended, and flees the scene. Julia is wrongly blamed for the death, and is herself about to be killed by Vittorio's son Paolo (Sizemore), when Corrado rescues her. They are then pursued all over Los Angeles by Paolo and his goons in a bid to escape.

Cast
 Johnny Messner as Corrado
 Tom Sizemore as Paolo Spinello
 Candace Elaine as Julia
 Edoardo Ballerini as Salvatore
 Ken Kercheval as Vittorio Spinello
 Joseph Gannascoli as Frankie
 Frank Stallone as Tommaso
 Tony Curran as Officer Tony
 Stelio Savante as Antonio

External links
 
 

2010 films
2010 action films
American action films
2010s English-language films
2010s American films